Laurence James Lieberman (born February 16, 1935) is an American poet and professor.

Books
 Carib's Leap: Selected and New Poems of the Caribbean, poetry (Leeds, England: Peepal Tree Press, 2005).
 Hour of the Mango Black Moon, poetry (Leeds, England: Peepal Tree Press, 2004).
 Flight from the Mother Stone, poetry (Fayetteville: University of Arkansas Press, 2000).
 The Regatta in the Skies: Selected Long Poems, poetry (Athens: University of Georgia Press, 1999).
 Compass of the Dying: Poems, poetry (Fayetteville: University of Arkansas Press, 1998).
 Dark Songs: Slave House and Synagogue: Poems, poetry (Fayetteville: University of Arkansas Press, 1996).
 Beyond the Muse of Memory: Essays on Contemporary American Poets, nonfiction (Columbia: University of Missouri Press, 1995). 
 New and Selected Poems, 1962–92, poetry (Urbana and Chicago: University of Illinois Press, 1993).
 The Creole Mephistopheles , poetry (New York: Scribner's, 1989).
 The Mural of Wakeful Sleep, poetry (New York: Macmillan, 1985).
 Eros at the World Kite Pageant: Poems 1979–82, poetry (New York: Macmillan, 1983).
 God's Measurements, poetry (New York: Macmillan, 1980).
 Unassigned Frequencies: American Poetry in Review 1964–77, nonfiction (Urbana and Chicago: University of Illinois Press, 1977).
 The Osprey Suicides, poetry (New York: Macmillan, 1973).
 The Achievement of James Dickey: A Comprehensive Selection of His Poems with a Critical Introduction, (editor), nonfiction  (New York: Scott, Foresman, 1969).
 The Unblinding, poetry (New York: Macmillan, 1968).

Sources
Contemporary Authors Online. The Gale Group, 2005.

1935 births
Living people
American male poets
Writers from Detroit
University of Michigan alumni